Manfred Pamminger (born 28 December 1977) is an Austrian football player currently playing for SC Rheindorf Altach.

References

1977 births
Living people
Austrian footballers
FC Red Bull Salzburg players

Association football midfielders